The 2003 Saint John's Johnnies football team represented Saint John's University as a member of the Minnesota Intercollegiate Athletic Conference (MIAC) during the 2003 NCAA Division III football season. In their 51st season under head coach John Gagliardi, the Johnnies compiled a 14–0 record and won the NCAA Division III championship.

The team played its home games at Clemens Stadium in Collegeville, Minnesota.

Schedule

Roster

1	Andy Humann	Fr.	DB	6-0	160	Monticello, Minn. / Monticello
1	Brandon Keller	Jr.	K	5-7	185	Bismarck, N.D. / St. Mary's Central
2	Blake Elliott	Sr.	WR	6-2	215	Melrose, Minn. / Melrose
3	Casey Haugen	Fr.	WR	5-9	170	St. Cloud, Minn. / Apollo
3	Mike Vigoren	Jr.	DB	6-2	190	Sartell, Minn. / Sartell
4	Mike Burtzel	Fr.	DB	5-11	170	Cold Spring, Minn. / Rocori
4	Isaac Flenner	Jr.	TE	6-2	212	Breckenridge, Minn. / Breckenridge
5	Dana Schleicher	Sr.	QB	5-11	210	Waite Park, Minn. / St. Cloud Apollo
5	Mike Zauhar	So.	DB	6-0	170	Brainerd, Minn. / Brainerd
6	Cole Deibele	Sr.	DB	6-0	175	Sleepy Eye, Minn. / Sleepy Eye
6	Drew Slagle	Fr.	QB	6-2	165	River Forest, Ill. 
7	Ryan Keating	Sr.	QB	5-11	195	Minnetonka, Minn. / Minnetonka
8	Jamie Steffensmeier	Fr.	LB	6-0	217	Mankato, Minn. / East
8	Zach Vertin	Jr.	QB	6-4	190	Breckenridge, Minn. / Breckenridge
9	Charlie Carr	Sr.	P	6-1	182	St. Cloud, Minn. / Apollo
9	Brandon Royce-Diop	Fr.	QB	6-1	185	Minneapolis, Minn. / De La Salle
10	Chase Beaudry	So.	RB	5-8	180	Elk River, Minn. / Elk River
10	Jonathan Casper	So.	DB	5-10	160	Wahpeton, N.D. / Wahpeton
11	Jordy Ruff	Jr.	QB	6-1	180	Wayzata, Minn. / Wayzata
11	Tom Wentzell	Fr.	DB	6-0	180	St. Paul, Minn. / Irondale
12	Adam Frie	Fr.	DB	6-0	190	Cold Spring, Minn. / Rocori
12	R.J. Welsh	Sr.	QB	6-0	170	Mendota Heights, Minn. 
13	Tannon Dvorak	So.	RB	5-8	180	Atkinson, Neb. / West Holt
13	Jake Witherbee	So.	SS	5-7	166	Annandale, Minn. / Annandale
14	Ryan Collins	Fr.	QB	6-2	190	Kasson, Minn. / Kasson-Mantorville
14	Mark Hawn	Jr.	DB	6-2	180	Eau Claire, Wis. / Regis
15	Jeremy Goltz	Sr.	DB	6-2	185	Tracy, Minn. / Tracy-Milroy
16	Danno Wagner	So.	LB	6-1	185	Hastings, Minn. / Hastings
16	Charlie Welsh	Fr.	QB	6-2	170	Mendota Heights, Minn. / St. Thomas Academy
17	Matt Mogenson	Fr.	QB	6-4	185	St. Peter, Minn. / St. Peter
17	Shawn Schoenberg	Fr.	DB	6-0	180	Melrose, Minn. / Melrose
18	Sam Benfante	Fr.	DB	5-10	180	Rosemount, Minn. / Rosemount
18	Lee Clintsman	Jr.	WR	5-11	170	Maplewood, Minn. / Hill-Murray
18	Nicholas Winscher	Jr.	LB	6-1	215	Sartell, Minn. / Sartell
19	Jeremy Hood	Sr.	LB	6-3	215	Buffalo, Minn. / Monticello
20	Brandon Hoskins	Fr.	WR	6-3	195	Billings, Mont. 
20	Scott LaVoy	So.	DB	6-1	190	Tracy, Minn. / Tracy-Milroy-Balaton
21	Paul Rieland	Fr.	RB	5-8	180	Melrose, Minn. / Melrose
21	Nick Thielman	Sr.	DB	5-11	175	St. Cloud, Minn. / Tech
22	Matt Breen	Jr.	RB	5-8	165	Willmar, Minn. / Willmar
22	Jason Prostrollo	Fr.	DB	5-7	170	Rosemount, Minn. / Rosemount
23	Eric Delzoppo	Fr.	K	5-11	172	Alexandria, Minn. / Alexandria
23	Jordan Wolf	Fr.	DB	6-1	185	Sauk Centre, Minn. / Sauk Centre
24	Ryan Blumhoefer	Fr.	WR	6-2	160	Fairfax, Minn. / Gibbon-Fairfax-Winthrop
24	Steve Scott	Jr.	DB	6-0	160	Red Wing, Minn. / Red Wing
25	Christian McPherson	Fr.	WR	6-2	190	Billings, Mont. 
25	Tony Steffensmeier	So.	RB	5-9	175	Mankato, Minn. / East
26	Joel Paulson	Sr.	TE	6-1	200	Mora, Minn. / Mora
27	Jake Theis	So.	RB	6-0	187	Shakopee, Minn. / Shakopee
27	Tom Vierkant	Jr.	LB	6-2	180	Detroit Lakes, Minn. / Detroit Lakes
28	Jerry D'Alessandro	Fr.	K	5-7	165	Maple Grove, Minn. / Osseo
28	Dan Pease	Fr.	DB	6-0	185	Plymouth, Minn. / Wayzata
29	Dave Blomdahl	So.	DB	5-9	165	Mora, Minn. / Mora
29	Charles Hollenback	Jr.	TE	6-3	235	Anoka, Minn. / Anoka
30	Michael Klobes	Jr.	WR	5-8	160	Scappoose, Ore. 
30	Matt Quinn	Fr.	DB	6-1	175	Maplewood, Minn. / North
31	Sam Koelbl	Fr.	DB	6-0	185	La Crosse, Wis. / Aquinas
31	Justin Winkels	Jr.	RB	6-1	180	Canby, Minn. / Canby
32	Josh Nelson	Sr.	RB	6-1	210	Milaca, Minn. / Milaca
32	Joe Neznik	So.	LB	6-0	195	Pequot Lakes, Minn. / Pequot Lakes
33	Paul Gans	Jr.	LB	6-0	195	Rice, Minn. / Sauk Rapids-Rice
34	Luke Furda	Fr.	RB	5-8	160	Brainerd, Minn. / Brainerd
34	Kevin McNamara	Fr.	DL	5-11	205	Mahtomedi, Minn. / Mahtomedi
35	Jeff Snegosky	So.	SS	6-0	175	New Hope, Minn. / Totino-Grace
35	David Soma	Sr.	RB	6-1	185	Woodbury, Minn. / Woodbury
36	Nathan Brever	Sr.	LB	6-3	205	St. Anthony / St. Anthony Village
36	Phil Kirsch	Fr.	RB	6-0	180	Kasson, Minn. / Kasson-Mantorville
37	Cameron McCambridge	Sr.	LB	6-2	220	Edina, Minn. / Edina
38	Reid Craigmile	Fr.	DB	5-10	170	Alexandria, Minn. / Alexandria
38	Justin Tucker	Jr.	RB	5-9	235	Eden Prairie, Minn. / Eden Prairie
39	Mark Reiner	Jr.	LB	6-0	200	Kensington, Minn. / West Central Area
39	Jed Riegelman	Sr.	WR	6-4	205	Red Wing, Minn. / Red Wing
41	Brian Adamek	So.	LB	5-11	195	Inver Grove Heights, Minn. / Rosemount
41	Mike Lofboom	Fr.	RB	6-0	185	Stillwater, Minn. / Mahtomedi
42	Matt Hawn	So.	LB	6-1	190	Eau Claire, Wis. / Regis
42	Jake Malone	Fr.	DB	5-8	160	New York Mills, Minn. / New York Mills
42	Luke Schumer	Jr.	TE	6-3	215	St. Stephen, Minn. / St. Cloud Cathedral
43	James Lehner	Jr.	RB	5-9	170	Albany, Minn. / Albany
43	Nicholas Winscher	Jr.	LB	6-1	215	Sartell, Minn. / Sartell
44	Steve LeVoir	Fr.	DL	6-1	230	Eden Prairie, Minn. / Eden Prairie
44	Dan Murphy	Jr.	WR	5-8	160	Henderson, Minn. / Le Sueur-Henderson
45	Aaron Babb	So.	FB	5-11	200	Sioux Falls, S.D. / O'Gorman
45	Mike Scharenbroich	So.	LB	6-1	205	Hopkins, Minn. / Hopkins
46	Gary Auer	Jr.	LB	5-10	200	Avon, Minn. / Holdingford
46	Mike Martin	Fr.	RB	5-4	150	Naperville, Ill. 
47	Adam Demarais	Fr.	RB	5-10	190	Foley, Minn. / Foley
47	Paul Schreiner	Sr.	LB	6-3	200	Watkins, Minn. / Rocori
48	Jay Dunne	Fr.	RB	5-9	200	West Dundee, Ill. / St. Viator's
48	Kurt Kipka	Fr.	DB	6-0	190	Becker, Minn. / Becker
49	Zane Breithaupt	So.	LB	5-11	220	Traverse City, Mich. 
49	Jared DeBoer	So.	LB	6-2	185	Milaca, Minn. / Milaca
50	Steve Peichel	So.	LB	6-3	210	Fairfax, Minn. / Fairfax/Gibbon-Fairfax-Winthrop
50	Jeff Soukup	Jr.	OL	6-1	230	Chanhassen, Minn. / Minnetonka
51	Steven Henle	So.	OL	6-4	260	New Ulm, Minn. / New Ulm
51	Aaron Schwartz	Fr.	LB	6-2	190	Cold Spring, Minn. / Rocori
52	Brian Smith	Jr.	OL	6-2	229	White Bear Lake, Minn. / St. Thomas Academy
53	Jason Primus	So.	OL	6-2	245	Melrose, Minn. / Melrose
54	Chris Feneis	So.	OL	6-0	220	Sartell, Minn. / Sartell
54	Ed Henry	So.	DT	6-3	250	St. Cloud, Minn. / Tech
55	Jim Diley	Jr.	OL	6-1	268	Edina, Minn. / Edina
56	Jason Blonigen	Sr.	OL	6-5	295	Freeport, Minn. / Melrose
56	Jason Hardie	So.	LB	6-2	205	Beresford, S.D. / Beresford
57	Matt Nelson	So.	OL	6-4	240	St. Cloud, Minn. / Apollo
57	Pete Steele	Fr.	LB	5-10	190	Becker, Minn. / Becker
58	Erik Brost	So.	OL	6-4	245	Maple Grove, Minn. / Maple Grove
58	Justin Walsh	Fr.	LB	6-1	220	Alexandria, Minn. / Alexandria
59	Nick Frost	Fr.	LB	6-0	215	Buffalo, Minn. / Buffalo
59	Jacob Zacher	So.	C	6-2	210	Alexandria, Minn. / Alexandria
60	Andy Elias	So.	DL	5-10	260	Cloquet, Minn. / Cloquet
60	Matt Hagen	Sr.	OL	6-0	243	Farmington, Minn. / Farmington
61	Brad Gustafson	Fr.	LB	6-1	195	Virginia, Minn. / Virginia
61	Jason Pfeilsticker	So.	DE	6-4	230	Wabasha, Minn. / Wabasha-Kellogg
62	Jeff Caldwell	Fr.	LB	6-0	205	Eagan, Minn. / Eagan
62	Charles O'Donnell	So.	OL	6-5	300	Baltimore, Md. / Loyola-Blakefield
63	Dana Kinsella	Fr.	OL	6-1	230	Sioux Falls, S.D. / O'Gorman
63	Josef Williams	Fr.	LB	6-0	180	Rochester, Minn. / Mayo
64	Mike Edgar	So.	LB	5-11	170	Floodwood, Minn. / Floodwood
64	Brian Mathiasen	So.	OL	6-1	263	St. Cloud, Minn. / Cathedral
65	Dan Philp	Fr.	LB	6-2	190	Waconia, Minn. / Waconia
65	Greg Trobec	Fr.	OL	5-9	225	Sartell, Minn. / Sartell
66	John Kaczorek	Jr.	OL	6-2	240	Mahtomedi, Minn. / Mahtomedi
66	Martin Morud	So.	LB	5-11	180	Bemidji, Minn. / Bemidji
67	Chris Tift	Fr.	DL	6-2	225	Sauk Rapids, Minn. / Sauk Rapids
67	Kyle Wirth	Sr.	OL	6-3	225	Shoreview, Minn. / Totino Grace
68	Rick Dold	Fr.	OL	6-0	330	Wanda, Minn. / Wabasso
68	Josh Rounds	Fr.	LB	6-1	190	Plymouth, Minn. / Wayzata
69	Joe Aronson	Jr.	OL	6-2	267	Minneapolis, Minn. / Holy Angels
69	Paul Menard	Fr.	LB	6-1	215	St. Paul, Minn. / Central
70	Jeremy Mohr	Sr.	OL	6-3	245	Morris, Minn. / Morris
70	Josh Pope	So.	DL	6-2	233	Mankato, Minn. / East
71	William Jimenez	Fr.	DL	5-10	260	Trinidad, Colo. / Catholic
71	Brett Moening	Fr.	OL	6-2	245	Melrose, Minn. / Melrose
71	Luke Schumacher	So.	OL	6-1	265	Arden Hills, Minn. / Totino-Grace
72	Dave Macalena	Sr.	OL	5-11	250	Buffalo, Minn. / Buffalo
73	Sean Conner	Sr.	OL	6-3	200	West Lebanon, N.H. 
74	David Nolan	So.	OL	6-5	290	Monticello, Minn. / Monticello
75	Ryan Petz	Jr.	OL	6-5	275	Hovland, Minn. / Cook County
76	Brian Tripp	Fr.	OL	6-4	250	Lakeville, Minn. / Lakeville
77	Tim Kelly	Fr.	OL	6-2	226	Chanhassen, Minn. / Eden Prairie
77	Ryan Weinandt	Sr.	DL	6-0	245	Wabasha, Minn. / Wabasha Kellogg
78	Eric Hanson	Sr.	OL	6-3	330	Elk River, Minn. / Elk River
79	Justin Cass	Sr.	OL	6-0	280	Eden Prairie, Minn. / Eden Prairie
80	Mike Foley	Fr.	WR	6-6	205	Eagan, Minn. / Eagan
81	Drew Krueger	Jr.	WR	6-3	180	Wayzata, Minn. / Orono
81	Kendrick Williams	Fr.	DL	6-2	200	Hinckley, Minn. / Hinckley-Finlayson
82	Steve Angell	Sr.	K	6-2	175	Arden Hills, Minn. / Totino-Grace
82	Phil Giesen	Fr.	WR	6-0	210	Hayden, Idaho / Coeur d'Alene
83	Adam Minnich	So.	WR	6-2	175	Dayton, Minn. / Champlin Park
85	Sean Fahnhorst	So.	LB	6-0	180	Bloomington, Minn. / Jefferson
85	Zach Reif	Fr.	K	6-5	175	St. Cloud, Minn. / Rocori
86	Tony Berendes	So.	WR	6-1	180	Maple Grove, Minn. / Totino-Grace
87	Travis Tomford	Fr.	WR	5-7	163	Melrose, Minn. / Melrose
88	Adam Barvels	Fr.	DL	6-4	215	Lake Lillian, Minn. 
88	Eric Reiner	So.	TE	6-1	205	Alexandria, Minn. / West Central
89	JJ Seggelke	So.	WR	6-2	180	Broomfield, Colo. 
90	Tom Bruns	Fr.	DL	6-1	210	Redwood Falls, Minn. / Redwood Valley
90	Erik Hokenstad	Fr.	TE	6-3	235	Bismarck, N.D. / Bismarck
91	Chris Cunningham	So.	DL	6-2	230	Germantown, Md. / Germantown
91	Kevin Karel	Fr.	WR	6-5	180	Shoreview, Minn. / Mounds View
92	Sean Fahnhorst	So.	TE	6-0	185	Bloomington, Minn. / Jefferson
92	Mathew Wachlarowicz	So.	DE	6-1	215	Silver Lake, Minn. / Glencoe-Silver Lake
93	Scott Karel	Fr.	WR	6-5	185	Shoreview, Minn. / Mounds View
93	Jonathan Lockhart	Jr.	DL	6-3	240	Apple Valley, Minn. / Eastview
94	Matt Darling	Sr.	DL	6-1	235	Sartell, Minn. / Sartell
94	Matt de Leon	So.	WR	5-9	175	Stillwater, Minn. / Stillwater
95	Guy Bellair	Sr.	DL	6-1	225	Lubbock, Texas 
96	Steve Danielson	Jr.	DE	6-3	215	Fargo, N.D. / Shanley
97	Damien Dumonceaux	So.	DL	6-1	225	St. Joseph, Minn. / Saint John's Prep
98	Joe Thomas	So.	LB	6-3	220	Chicago, Ill. / Loyola Academy
99	Dave Dirkswager	So.	DL	6-3	230	Eden Prairie, Minn. / Eden Prairie
99	Sam Pearson	So.	TE	6-3	220	Cambridge, Minn. / Cambridge

References

Saint John's
Saint John's Johnnies football seasons
NCAA Division III Football Champions
Minnesota Intercollegiate Athletic Conference football champion seasons
Saint John's Johnnies football
College football undefeated seasons